The Black Goodbye EP is an EP by Kenna.  It was available for promotional use only.

Track listing

Personnel 

 Kenna - Vocals, Writing, Producer
 Chad Hugo - Producer

References 

Kenna albums
2007 EPs